"Language" is a song by American electronic music producer and DJ Porter Robinson. The song was uploaded on YouTube by Porter Robinson on April 1, 2012. The song was released in the United States on Big Beat Records as a digital download on April 10, 2012. The song was later released in the United Kingdom in an EP package from Ministry of Sound on August 12, 2012. It debuted at number nine on the UK Singles Chart. The song features uncredited vocals from Heather Bright. The song received remixes from producers Kayzo together with Gammer, and from Jauz.

Music video
A music video to accompany the release of "Language" was first released on YouTube on August 1, 2012, with a total length of three minutes and thirty-three seconds. The music video portrays a young woman (Susannah Hart Jones) running away from wolf-like creatures and befriending a giant-like creature. As of July 2017, the video has over 10.2 million views.

In popular media
 "Language" was included as part of the soundtrack to the game Forza Horizon, and is heard in the main menu of the game. It is also included in Forza Horizon 5 as part of its 10th anniversary update.

Track listing

Charts

Certifications

Release history

References

2012 singles
2012 songs
Porter Robinson songs
Big Beat Records (American record label) singles
Ministry of Sound singles
Song recordings produced by Porter Robinson
Songs written by Heather Bright
Songs written by Porter Robinson